OEP may refer to:

 Object Engineering Process
 Occurrence Exceedance Probability, a risk curve used in catastrophe modeling
 Octaethylporphyrin, a synthetic porphyrin 
 Office for Environmental Protection, UK organisation to be created by the Environment Bill and as of July 2021 existing in an interim state
 Office of Emergency Preparedness, U.S. Executive Branch organization abolished in 1973 and responsibilities divided among several organizations
 Office of Emergency Planning, emergency planning organisation within Ireland's Dept. of Defence
 One Equity Partners, the private equity affiliate of JPMorgan Chase
 Open Educational Practices
 Open Energy Platform, a project providing database infrastructure for open energy system models
 Open Enrollment Period, a period of time in which individuals may enroll in or change their health insurance plans.
 Optometric Extension Program
 Országos Egészségbiztosítási Pénztár (National Health Insurance Fund), the publicly funded health service organization of Hungary
 Oxfordshire Economic Partnership